Anaxagorea phaeocarpa is a species of plant in the Annonaceae family. It is found in Costa Rica and Honduras.

References

Anaxagorea
Endangered plants
Flora of Costa Rica
Flora of Honduras
Taxonomy articles created by Polbot